Lraber ("Messenger") was an Armenian language weekly newspaper published in Astrakhan, Russian Empire 1908-1909. K. Khachaturian was the editor and publisher of the newspaper.

References

Armenian-language newspapers
Newspapers established in 1908
Publications disestablished in 1909
Defunct newspapers published in Russia
Newspapers published in Russia